The Francis Stephen Award is an international scientific honor given to researchers in the humanities and social sciences. It is awarded every two or three years by the Österreichische Gesellschaft zur Erforschung des 18. Jahrhunderts (Austrian Society of 18th-Century Studies).

History 
Created in 2000, the Francis Stephen Award, endowed with €1500, pays homage to Francis I, the husband of the Empress Maria-Theresa, and her interest in Austrian science, arts and culture. It honors works of excellence written in German, French or English about the 18th century or the Habsburg monarchy. The award ceremony takes place at the University of Vienna.

Selection 
The board of directors of the society decide on the value of the submitted works in a multi-stage assessment process with the help of specialist consultants who have been designated thematically. The consultants include academics and interdisciplinary specialists of the 18th century.

Recipients

Bibliography 
 Jahrbuch der Österreichischen Gesellschaft zur Erforschung des 18. Jahrhunderts (ISSN 1015-406X).

See also 
 Francis I, Holy Roman Emperor
 List of history awards
 List of general awards in the humanities
 List of social sciences awards

References 

Academic awards
International awards
Austrian awards
2000 establishments in Austria
Awards established in 2000
Francis I, Holy Roman Emperor